The 2009 Asian Fencing Championships was held in Doha, Qatar from 14 November to 19 November 2009.

Medal summary

Men

Women

Medal table

References

FIE 2009 Annual Report

External links
Official website

Asian Championship
F
Asian Fencing Championships
Fencing competitions in Qatar
International sports competitions hosted by Qatar